Mount Ord may refer to:

 Mount Ord (Arizona)
 Mount Ord (Texas)
 Ord Peak, a sub-peak of Mount Baldy (Arizona)
 Little Mount Ord in Maricopa County, Arizona